Galanes is a surname. Notable people with the surname include:

Jim Galanes (born 1956), American skier
Joseph Galanes (born 1965), American cross-country skier
Philip Galanes (born 1962), American writer and lawyer